Balnacoul Halt railway station served the village of Mosstodloch, Moray, Scotland from 1893 to 1931 on the Inverness and Aberdeen Junction Railway.

History 
The station opened as Balnacoul Platform on 23 October 1893 by the Highland Railway. The suffix 'platform' was dropped in 1904 but 'halt' was added in 1928. The station closed to both passengers and goods traffic on 14 September 1931.

References

External links 

Disused railway stations in Moray
Former Highland Railway stations
Railway stations in Great Britain opened in 1893
Railway stations in Great Britain closed in 1931
1893 establishments in Scotland
1931 disestablishments in Scotland